Since Florida became a U.S. state in 1845, it has sent congressional delegations to the United States Senate and United States House of Representatives. Each state elects two senators to serve for six years, and members of the House to two-year terms. Before becoming a state, the Florida Territory elected a non-voting delegate at-large to Congress from 1822 to 1845.

These are tables of congressional delegations from Florida to the United States Senate and the United States House of Representatives.

Current delegation 

Florida's current congressional delegation in the  consists of its two senators, both of whom are Republicans, and its 28 representatives: 20 Republicans and 8 Democrats.
Starting in the 2022 midterms, per the 2020 United States census, Florida will gain one new congressional seat.

United States Senate

United States House of Representatives

1822–1845: 1 non-voting delegate 
Starting on January 23, 1823, Florida Territory sent a non-voting delegate to the House.

1845–1873: 1 seat 
Following statehood on March 3, 1845, Florida had one seat in the House.

1873–1903: 2 seats 
Following the 1870 census, Florida was apportioned a second seat.

1903–1913: 3 seats 
Following the 1900 census, Florida was apportioned a third seat.

1913–1933: 4 seats 
Following 1910 census, Florida was apportioned 4 seats. From 1913 to 1915 only, an at-large seat was used. Starting in 1915, however, four districts were used.

1933–1943: 5 seats 
Following the 1930 census, Florida was apportioned 5 seats. From 1933 to 1937 only, an at-large seat was used. Starting in 1937, however, five districts were used.

1943–1953: 6 seats 
Following the 1940 census, Florida was apportioned 6 seats. From 1943 to 1945 only, an at-large seat was used. Starting in 1945, however, six districts were used.

1953–1963: 8 seats 
Following the 1950 census, Florida was apportioned 8 seats.

1963–1973: 12 seats 
Following the 1960 census, Florida was apportioned 12 seats.

1973–1983: 15 seats 
Following the 1970 census, Florida was apportioned 15 seats.

1983–1993: 19 seats 
Following the 1980 census, Florida was apportioned 19 seats.

1993–2003: 23 seats 
Following the 1990 census, Florida was apportioned 23 seats.

2003–2013: 25 seats 
Following the 2000 census, Florida was apportioned 25 seats.

2013–2023: 27 seats 
Following the 2010 census, Florida was apportioned 27 seats.

From 2023: 28 seats 
Following the 2020 census, Florida was apportioned 28 seats.

Key

See also

List of United States congressional districts
Florida's congressional districts
Political party strength in Florida

Notes 

 
 
Florida
Politics of Florida
Congressional delegations